Elgin v. Department of Treasury, 567 U.S. 1 (2012), was a United States Supreme Court case where the Court ruled that the Civil Service Reform Act of 1978 (CSRA) gives exclusive jurisdiction for claims under the Act to the U.S. Court of Appeals for the Federal Circuit. Additionally, the Court held that the Act bars federal district courts from ruling on matters related to the act including adverse employment actions of the federal departments, and allows the Merit Systems Protection Board to hear constitutional arguments for wrongful employee severance and adverse employment actions. It was a 6–3 decision, with the majority opinion delivered by Justice Clarence Thomas. The case greatly limited the recourse of federal employees to the courts for adverse employment practices, allowing such recourse only to a few, specific courts as aforementioned.

Prior to the Supreme Court
Elgin challenged his discharge before the Merit Systems Protection Board, claiming such a requirement is unconstitutional being a bill of attainder and a violation of the Equal Protection Clause of the Fourteenth Amendment, since only males are required to enroll in the Selective Service System. The Merit Systems Protection Board referred the case to an administrative law judge, who dismissed the appeal for lack of jurisdiction, concluding that an employee is not entitled to Merit Systems Protection Board review of agency action that is based on an absolute statutory bar to employment. The same administrative law judge also ruled that the Merit Systems Protection Board did not have jurisdiction to rule on the constitutionality of statutes.

Rather than appealing to the U.S. Court of Appeals for the Federal Circuit as is required by the CSRA, Elgin and several other petitioners appealed to the United States District Court for the District of Massachusetts. The court denied Elgin's claims, holding that the act and Elgin's severance was constitutional. Elgin appealed to the U.S. Court of Appeals for the First Circuit, which ruled that federal district courts have no jurisdiction over the matter. Elgin appealed to the United States Supreme Court.

See also 
 Rostker v. Goldberg
 National Coalition for Men v. Selective Service System

References

External links
 
 

United States Supreme Court cases
2012 in United States case law
United States public employment case law
United States Supreme Court cases of the Roberts Court
Gender issues in the military
Conscription in the United States